The Utah & Northern Railway is a defunct railroad that was operated in the Utah Territory and later in the Idaho Territory and Montana Territory in the western United States during the 1870s and 1880s.  It was the first railroad in Idaho and in Montana. The line was acquired by a Union Pacific Railroad subsidiary, the Oregon Short Line, and is today operated by the Union Pacific Railroad as the Ogden Subdivision (Ogden to McCammon, Idaho), part of the Pocatello Subdivision (McCammon to Pocatello, Idaho), and the Montana Subdivision (Pocatello to Butte, Montana).

The original  of the Utah Northern Railroad (later named Utah & Northern Railway) was conceived and built by the Mormons.  It was a  narrow gauge spur off the Union Pacific portion of the transcontinental railroad. The labor for this railroad was largely volunteer Mormon labor as the intent of the railroad was to serve the Mormon communities in the Cache Valley that had been settled almost entirely by the Mormons.  It was a case of Mormons forming a company and building their own railroad because existing railroad companies showed no interest in building such a railroad. The northern half of the Cache Valley is in Idaho and, due to claims and disputes by the Shoshone and Bannock Indians, was not settled by the Mormons until after the Bear River Massacre and subsequent Fort Bridger Treaty of 1868 that forced the Shoshone and Bannock onto reservations. The original Mormon plan for the Utah Northern was to build a railroad to the communities in the Cache Valley and about  into Idaho to Soda Springs, Idaho, that lies in a valley beyond called the Bear River Valley. This was by dictate of Brigham Young as he owned land in Soda Springs and believed that the Bear River Valley had potential for further Mormon settlement. The Mormons also believed they could break the monopoly that the anti-Mormon town of Corinne, Utah, had on the wagon freight business on the Montana Trail by extending the railroad into Idaho. There were tentative plans to eventually extend the Utah Northern to Montana. The road was constructed northward from the Union Pacific line at Ogden commencing construction on August 24, 1871. In three years, the largely volunteer railroad company had built  of road. It reached Franklin, Idaho, across the Idaho border, in May 1874 where construction was halted. Investors had become hesitant after the panic of 1873 and the railroad was now moving into the northern half of the Cache Valley where there were fewer Mormon volunteers due to this area only recently having been relinquished by the Bannock and Shoshone. Poor decisions by the planners and the lack of business from the frugal residents of the Cache Valley led to the bankruptcy and foreclosure sale of the Utah Northern only a few years later in 1878.

Robber baron Jay Gould transformed the Utah Northern. He and Union Pacific acquired the Utah Northern Railroad, changing the name to the Utah & Northern Railway and infused the railroad with capital. Big business knew that an electrical age was coming and that the demand for copper products was putting pressure on copper prices. They knew that there were rich copper deposits at the mines near Butte, Montana. Union Pacific quickly resumed construction on the Utah & Northern Railway after purchase in April 1878. Jay Gould invested personal money to get construction started just beyond Franklin in the fall of 1877. The new plan was not to build the road to Soda Springs, but to build a longer road on a direct route through the Cache Valley, then north across eastern Idaho and north across western Montana to Butte, Montana. In the second year, they added another  of track and crossed the continental divide at the Idaho/Montana border. After three and a half years of construction, before the close of 1881, they completed the additional  of road to Butte, Montana. Butte became the largest copper producing city in the world and Butte's population, by some estimates, grew to nearly 100,000. This made Butte, with its "Copper Kings," the second largest city in the West with more influence than Salt Lake City, Denver, Sacramento, Seattle, or Portland. Only San Francisco remained larger and more important. Butte, with its large-scale mining and smelting operations, was dubbed the Pittsburg of the West.

The railroad operated successfully for several years and finally became a branch of the Union Pacific Railroad.

See also
 Utah Central Railroad (1869–81)
 Utah Southern Railroad (1871–81)

References

External links
 Ogden Rails: Utah Northern, Utah & Northern (with citations)

Defunct Utah railroads
Defunct Montana railroads
Defunct Idaho railroads
Pre-statehood history of Idaho
Utah Territory
Pre-statehood history of Montana
3 ft gauge railways in the United States
Predecessors of the Union Pacific Railroad
Railway companies established in 1878
Railway companies disestablished in 1889
Narrow gauge railroads in Utah
Narrow gauge railroads in Montana
Narrow gauge railroads in Idaho